Izel N. Jenkins, Jr. (born May 27, 1964) is a former professional American football defensive back in the National Football League (NFL) for the Philadelphia Eagles, Minnesota Vikings, and New York Giants during the late 1980s and early 1990s.  He was drafted by the Eagles in the 11th round (288th overall) of the 1988 NFL Draft.

References

External links
 Where Are They Now: CB Izel Jenkins

1964 births
Living people
People from Wilson, North Carolina
Minnesota Vikings players
New York Giants players
NC State Wolfpack football players
Philadelphia Eagles players
Players of American football from North Carolina
American football defensive backs